Temescal Mountains, also known as the Sierra Temescal (Spanish for "sweat lodge range"), are one of the northernmost mountain ranges of the Peninsular Ranges in western Riverside County, in Southern California in the United States. They extend for approximately 25 mi (40 km) southeast of the Santa Ana River east of the Elsinore Fault Zone to the Temecula Basin and form the western edge of the Perris Block.

The Santa Ana Mountains lie to the west, the Elsinore Mountains to the south and the Perris Valley and Lakeview Mountains to the east.

History

The Temescal Mountains were originally named by the Spanish, Sierra Temescal, (perhaps from the nearby Rancho Temescal), a name which appears on the Rail Road Route survey map made by the U. S. Army Pacific Railroad Surveys in 1854–55.  The Temescal Mountains are one of the northernmost of Peninsular Ranges of California, running from the south side of the Santa Anna River, southeast nearly parallel with the Santa Ana Mountains, from which it is separated by the Temescal Valley and Elsinore Valley sections of the Elsinore Trough.  The Temescal Mountains were originally considered to be bounded on the south by the San Jacinto River, by J. D. Whitney in his 1865 Geological Survey of California.  A later study by Rene Engel, considers the Sedco Hills and the other mountains that extend to the southeast of the San Jacinto River east of Lake Elsinore and north of the Temecula Basin, in Murrieta to be part of the same range forming the natural continuation of the mountains.  The Murrieta Hogbacks are the southeasternmost heights of the range, overlooking the Warm Springs Creek Canyon.

Geology
As part of the Perris Block, the Temescal Mountains are part of its eroded mass of Cretaceous and older granitic rocks of the Peninsular Ranges Batholith and metasedimentary basement rocks.  Most of this basement rock that once overlay the granitic plutons that rose up into it, has been eroded away, the remainder being found between the similarly eroded plutons of granitic rock.

Natural resources 

Flora
As part of the California Floristic Province, the Temescal Mountains host a diverse array of plant species within distinctive natural (plant) communities, including coastal sage scrub, chaparral, riparian woodland, southern oak woodland, rocky outcrop and valley grassland. Rare flowers like the intermediate mariposa lily, grow there. Fragrant sages, evergreen shrubs and trees, perennial bunchgrasses, Dudleya species of succulents, fire-following flowers and other wildflowers adorn the terrain.

Fauna
Wildlife species found, include mountain lion, mule deer, bobcat, coyote, raccoon, gray fox, American badger, spotted skunk, kangaroo rat, bats, ravens, red tailed hawk, mountain quail, canyon wren, speckled rattlesnake, Pacific rattlesnake, common kingsnake, gopher snake, two-striped garter snake, rosy boa, San Diego night snake, granite spiny lizard, arroyo toad, western spadefoot toad, various Aphonopelma species of tarantula, Quino checkerspot butterfly and many more. Gray wolf, pronghorn, and California condor were also once found in the range.

Commercial uses
A number of mineral resources have been mined in the range. Commercial resources collected since the 1840s have included the metals tin and gold, and the non-metals clay, coal, and granite. Parts of the range have been used to graze domestic livestock from the early 19th century. The little water found in the range has become a particularly valued resource.

Geographic features
Geographic features, northwest to southeast, include:

 Beacon Hill
 Lake Norconian
 La Sierra Heights or Norco Hills
 Hole Benchmark
 Linn Benchmark
 Rattlesnake Peak (Riverside County, California)
 La Sierra Summit
 Grape Benchmark
 Riverside Valley
 Pedley Hills
 Lake Evans reservoir
 Spring Brook
 North Hill 
 Mount Rubidoux
 Tequesquito Arroyo
 Box Springs Canyon
 Sycamore Canyon
 Pachappa Hill
 Victoria Hill
 Alessandro Arroyo
 Quarry Hill
 Prenda Arroyo
 Woodcrest Arroyo
 Mockingbird Canyon
 Arlington Mountain
 Eagle Valley
 Three Sisters
 Cajalco Canyon Creek
 Cajalco Canyon
 Lake Mathews 
 Cajalco Valley
 Harford Spring Canyon          
 Mead Valley
 Olsen Canyon
 Black Rocks
 Monument Peak
 Gavilan Peak
 Gavilan Plateau
 Gavilan Hills
 Summit 2557  
 Santa Rosa Mine Ridge
 Steele Peak
 Steele Valley
 Dawson Canyon
 Estelle Mountain 2,767 feet
 Summit 2729
 Summit 2615 
 Summit 2625 
 Ceramic Factory Canyon 
 Alberhill Canyon 
 Gavilan Wash
 Walker Canyon
 Alberhill Summit 
 Clevelin Hills
 Warm Springs Valley
 Stovepipe Canyon
 Arroyo del Toro
 Rosetta Canyon
 Wasson Canyon 
 Railroad Canyon
 Canyon Lake reservoir
 City of Canyon Lake
 Quail Valley
 Gripp Hill
 Cottonwood Canyon
 Sedco Hills
 Guadalupe Hill
 Wildomar Peak
 Bundy Canyon
 Iodine Spring Summit   
 Iodine Spring
 Adelaide Peak
 Murrieta Hogbacks

References

External links
8c. 1c. 32854c. 1170240:From-San-Francisco-Bay-to-the-Plain?sort=Pub_List_No_InitialSort%2CPub_Date%2CPub_List_No%2CSeries_No&qvq=q:Pacific%2BRailroad%2BSurvey;sort:Pub_List_No_InitialSort%2CPub_Date%2CPub_List_No%2CSeries_No;lc:RUMSEYc. 8c. 1&mi=61&trs=71  Book Map "From San Francisco Bay to the Plains of Los Angeles", from Explorations and Surveys made under the direction of The Hon. Jefferson Davis, Secretary of War by Lieut. John G. Parke, Topl. Engrs. assisted by Albert H. Campbell, Civil Engineer and N.H. Hutton, H. Custer and G.G. Garner. 1854 & 55. Map No. 1. Constructed and drawn by H. Custer. Explorations and Surveys for a Rail Road Route from the Mississippi River to the Pacific Ocean. War Department. Coast Route, California, Reports of Explorations and Surveys, to Ascertain the Most Practicable and Economical Route for a Railroad From the Mississippi River to the Pacific Ocean, A.O.P. Nicholson I-XI, Washington, 1861, from David Rumsey Historical Map Collection

 
Peninsular Ranges
Mountain ranges of Riverside County, California
Mountain ranges of Southern California